Gestoorde hengelaar (English: Disturbed Angler) was the first Dutch fictional film, made by M.H. Laddé in 1896 and was produced by the studio Eerst Nederlandsch Atelier tot het vervaardigen van Films voor de Bioscoop en Cinematograaf van M.H. Laddé en J.W. Merkelbach.

The short silent film was first shown by the traveling cinema Grand Théatre Edison of Christiaan Slieker on Sunday 29 November 1896 in the Parktuin Tivoli in Utrecht.

The film was not preserved and no known photos were taken of it. That means that it is a lost film.

It is only known that Gestoorde hengelaar was a slapstick comedy scene (with Lion Solser and Piet Hesse, who were then popular Dutch comedians) from the flyer which Slieker distributed.

The film was shown in Slieker's cinema using a cinematograph, made by H.O. Foersterling & Co from Berlin, Germany. A fairground organ provided music during the film's showing.

See also
 List of Dutch films before 1910

References

Sources 
 A. Briels, Komst en plaats van de Levende Photographie op de kermis. Een filmhistorische verkenning, Assen (1973), p. 30
 K. Dibbets & F. van der Maden (red.), Geschiedenis van de Nederlandse film en bioscoop tot 1940, Weesp (1986), p. 19
G. Donaldson, Of Joy and Sorrow. A Filmography of Dutch Silent Fiction, Amsterdam (1997), p. 51

External links 
 

1896 films
Dutch black-and-white films
Dutch silent short films
Dutch comedy films
Films about fishing
Films shot in the Netherlands
Films set in the Netherlands
Lost Dutch films
1896 comedy films
1890s lost films
Lost comedy films
1896 short films
Silent comedy films
Silent adventure films